Tisá is a municipality and village in Ústí nad Labem District in the Ústí nad Labem Region of the Czech Republic. It has about 1,000 inhabitants.

Etymology
The name is derived from the Proto-Slavic word tes and the Czech word tis, meaning "yew".

Geography

It lies on the border with Germany.

Tisá is mostly located in the western tip of the Elbe Sandstone Mountains and the eponymous protected landscape area. The southern part belongs to the Ore Mountains. Tisá is known for a group of rocks and natural monument within the Elbe Sandstone Mountains, the Tisa Rocks.

History
Around the year 500, a group of the Slavs came to the area of today's village. In the 14th century the Vantenberk family usurped an extensive area around Děčín and built a stronghold named Šenov. Under the region of knights of Bünau there was a major economic expansion. In 1554–1557, Günter I developed a castle with a Lutheran church, presbytery, school and brewery, and the name of the village was changed due to the castle into Schönstein. In 1631, Croatians and Swedes burned all of the objects in Tisá and Schönstein, and Schönstein lost its importance. From 1750, several factories were built, and the municipality became a centre of the button industry.

Sport
Tisa Rocks are a popular area for rock climbing. The area includes 134 rocks suitable for climbing with a height of 10–50 m.

Sights
Church of Saint Anne is the landmark of the village. This Baroque building was built in 1789.

Notable people
Václav Zítek (1932–2011), opera singer

References

External links

Populated places in Ústí nad Labem District